Coston Fen, Runhall is a  biological Site of Special Scientific Interest between Dereham and Wymondham in Norfolk. It is part of the Norfolk Valley Fens Special Area of Conservation.

This spring-fed site in the Yare valley has a variety of fen habitats, including a nationally rare calcareous mire community of fen flora. There are also areas of tall herbs, scrub and improved pasture.

The site is private land with no public access.

References

Sites of Special Scientific Interest in Norfolk
Special Areas of Conservation in England